Shadi Abu Dib (born 14 July 1975) is an Arab–Israeli footballer, who had played in Israel and Poland. After retirement, Abu Dib coached youth teams and took on his first senior team in 2015, when he began coaching F.C. Kafr Qasim Nibrass.

External links

References

1975 births
Living people
People from Jaljulia
Footballers from Central District (Israel)
Arab citizens of Israel
Arab-Israeli footballers
Israeli footballers
Hapoel Tayibe F.C. players
Hapoel Rishon LeZion F.C. players
Śląsk Wrocław players
Hapoel Jerusalem F.C. players
Maccabi Ahi Nazareth F.C. players
Hapoel Tzafririm Holon F.C. players
A.S. Eilat players
Hapoel Jaljulia F.C. players
Liga Leumit players
Israeli Premier League players
Szczakowianka Jaworzno players
Israeli expatriate footballers
Expatriate footballers in Poland
Israeli expatriate sportspeople in Poland
Association football midfielders